Negative Theater, a European-only CD, is the fifth solo album released by Ric Ocasek.

Negative Theater was originally intended to be Ocasek's fourth solo effort, consisting of a double CD and a book of poetry.  However, in North America, Reprise Records declined to release the CD in Ocasek's original form.  Instead, the company took 7 tracks from Ocasek's project, and had him record 7 additional tracks with producer Mike Shipley.  The resulting record was issued as Quick Change World in North America only.

For European release, Negative Theater was issued as a 15-track CD.  It included 7 tracks that were issued on Quick Change World, and 8 tracks that are exclusive to this album.

Track listing
All tracks composed by Ric Ocasek, except where indicated.
Tracks listed with an asterisk (*) were previously released on Quick Change World in North America.

 "I Still Believe" *
 "Come Alive" *
 "Quick Change World" *
 "Ride with Duce"
 "What's on TV" *
 "Shake a Little Nervous"
 "Hopped Up" *
 "Take Me Silver"
 "Telephone Again" *
 "Race to Nowhere" (Alan Vega)
 "Help Me Find America" *
 "Who Do I Pay"
 "Wait For Fate"
 "What Is Time"
 "Fade Away"

Personnel
Ric Ocasek - vocals, keyboards, guitar, art direction, photography
Eric Schermerhorn - guitar, keyboards
Darryl Jenifer - bass
Greg Hawkes - keyboards
Nano the 2'nd - drums

Ric Ocasek albums
1993 albums
Albums produced by Ric Ocasek
Reprise Records albums